The 2022 F2000 Championship Series season was the eleventh season of the F2000 Championship Series. The sixteen round season began on April 1 at Carolina Motorsports Park, and finished on October 16 at Pittsburgh International Race Complex.

Last year's champion, Trent Walko of Global Racing Team, won the his first championship. JC Trahan won the championship with Global Racing Team.

Drivers and teams

Schedule

Results

Driver Standings

See also
2022 F1600 Championship Series

References

F2000 Championship Series seasons
F2000